"Dive into the Mirror"  is the first single by Japanese rock group Defspiral after Wilma-Sidr line-up reunited under their new name. The song is the group's second release under Avex Group's Avex Mode label and it was used as the opening song of the Japanese dub of Kamen Rider: Dragon Knight. The single charted at number 77 on the Oricon Weekly Charts, remaining on the charts for two weeks, and debuted at number 89 on the Billboard Japan Hot Single Sales charts for the week of June 7, 2010.

Track list

References

Kamen Rider
2010 singles
Japanese television drama theme songs
2010 songs